Dłużyce  is a village in the administrative district of Gmina Ścinawa, within Lubin County, Lower Silesian Voivodeship, in south-western Poland.

The village has a population of 110.

References

Villages in Lubin County